Mary Janet Carroll (née Hutchinson) was an elite netball player for Australia.  She played for Australia in the early 60's playing with Norma Plummer.

References

Australian netball players
Year of birth missing (living people)
Living people
Australia international netball players
Place of birth missing (living people)